The Embassy of Hungary in Washington, D.C. is Hungary's diplomatic mission to the United States. It is located at the Brodhead-Bell-Morton Mansion. It was previously located at 3910 Shoemaker Street, Northwest, Washington, D.C., in the Cleveland Park neighborhood. Hungary also has consulate offices in Chicago, New York City and Los Angeles.

In 2004 the Hungarian government paid $3 million for the former house of John Edwards at 2215 30th Street, N.W. to house then-ambassador András Simonyi.

The Ambassador is Szabolcs Ferenc Takács. Previously it was László Szabó.

See also
Hungary – United States relations

References

External links

Official website
wikimapia

Hungary
Washington, D.C.
Forest Hills (Washington, D.C.)
Hungary–United States relations